The Pakistan national cricket team toured New Zealand in December and January 1992–93 and played a Test match against the New Zealand national cricket team, winning the match by 33 runs. New Zealand were captained by Ken Rutherford and Pakistan by Javed Miandad. In addition, the teams played a three-match series of Limited Overs Internationals (LOI) which New Zealand won 2–1.

One Day Internationals (ODIs)

New Zealand won the series 2-1.

1st ODI

2nd ODI

3rd ODI

Test series summary

References

External links

1992 in Pakistani cricket
1993 in Pakistani cricket
1992 in New Zealand cricket
1993 in New Zealand cricket
International cricket competitions from 1991–92 to 1994
New Zealand cricket seasons from 1970–71 to 1999–2000
1992